Bente Moe (born 2 December 1960) is a retired Norwegian long-distance runner who specialized in the marathon race. She represented SK Vidar.

In the marathon she finished 26th at the 1984 Summer Olympics, sixth at the 1986 European Championships and fourth at the 1987 World Championships. She ran at the 1988 Summer Olympics without finishing, and also competed at the World Cross Country Championships in 1988 and 1989 without any success. She became Norwegian champion in marathon in 1991.

Personal bests
10,000 metres - 32:59.68 min (1987) - ninth among Norwegian 10,000 m runners.
Half marathon - 1:11:54 hrs (1988) - eighth among Norwegian half marathon runners.
Marathon - 2:32:36 hrs (1988) - sixth among Norwegian marathon runners.

Achievements

References

1960 births
Living people
Norwegian female long-distance runners
Athletes (track and field) at the 1984 Summer Olympics
Athletes (track and field) at the 1988 Summer Olympics
Olympic athletes of Norway
Frankfurt Marathon female winners
Norwegian female marathon runners